Arthur Griffin may refer to:

Arthur Griffin (architect) (1883–1967), New Zealand architect
Arthur Griffin (cricketer) (1887–1962), English cricketer
Arthur Griffin (footballer) (1871–1945), English footballer
Arthur Griffin (photographer) (1903–2001), American photographer
Arthur Griffin Claypole (1882–1929), English cathedral organist
A. Harry Griffin (1911–2004), British journalist and mountaineer
A. J. Griffin (born 1988), American baseball pitcher
Arthur Griffin, a character in American TV series Big Time Rush

See also 
 James Arthur Griffin better known as Jimmy Griffin
 Arthur
 Griffin (surname)
 Archie Griffin (born 1954), American football player
 Arthur Griffith (disambiguation)
 Arthur Griffiths (disambiguation)